Viktor Serdeniuk (born 27 January 1996) is a Ukrainian professional footballer who plays as a midfielder for Longford Town in the League of Ireland First Division.

Career
Born in Artsyz, Serdenyuk is a product of the FC Chornomorets youth system.

He played for Chornomorets Odesa in the Ukrainian Premier League Reserves and transferred to Real Pharma Odesa in July 2016. But one year later, in July 2017, Serdenyuk returned again to FC Chornomorets in the Ukrainian Premier League. He made his debut on 22 July 2017 against FC Stal Kamianske.

On 1 September 2022, he signed for League of Ireland Premier Division club Shamrock Rovers, having previously moved to Ireland to escape the 2022 Russian Invasion of Ukraine. In doing so, he became the first Ukrainian player to play in the Irish Premier Division. He also won the 2022 League of Ireland Premier Division with Shamrock Rovers. On 3 January 2023, it was announced that he had signed for League of Ireland First Division side Longford Town.

Honours
Shamrock Rovers
League of Ireland Premier Division: 2022

Kremin Kremenchuk
Ukrainian Second League: 2018–19

Chornomorets Odesa
Ukrainian Cup: Runner-Up 2012–13

References

External links 
Profile from Website of Longford Town

1996 births
Living people
People from Artsyz
Ukrainian footballers
FC Chornomorets Odesa players
FC Real Pharma Odesa players
Ukrainian Premier League players
Association football midfielders
Ukraine youth international footballers
FC Zhemchuzhyna Odesa players
FC Kremin Kremenchuk players
FC Balkany Zorya players
Sportspeople from Odesa Oblast
Shamrock Rovers F.C. players
Longford Town F.C. players
League of Ireland players
Ukrainian expatriate footballers
Expatriate association footballers in the Republic of Ireland
Ukrainian expatriate sportspeople in Ireland